Sieben (German for Seven) is the seventh studio album by German gothic metal band Schwarzer Engel. It was released on 7 August 2022 via independent label Massacre Records. The album was originally slated for a 2020 release, but was pushed back due to the COVID-19 pandemic.

Reception
The album was received with generally positive reviews from critics. Paul M of European magazine Time for Metal gave the album an 8/10, commenting that the album is "full of feeling" (voller Gefühle), and that "you won't get bored either" (wird einem auch nicht langweilig). Jannik Kleeman writing for German webzine metal.de commented that Schwarzer Engel manages to "implement the sometimes quite striking themes so atmospherically that you can lose yourself in the melodies while listening" (die teilweise recht plakativen Themen so stimmungsvoll umzusetzen, dass man sich beim Hören in den Melodien verlieren kann).

Track listing

Charts

References

External links
Official website

German-language albums
Schwarzer Engel albums
2022 albums
Gothic metal albums by German artists